Isak Lauritssøn Falck (1601 – 9 March 1669) was a Norwegian land owner and timber merchant. He is associated with the development of the seaport of  Risør in Aust-Agder, Norway.

He was born in Sandeherred (now Sandefjord) in Vestfold, Norway. He was the son of merchant Laurits Kristoffersen, a lumber merchant in Tønsberg. He settled in Risør  during the 1620s. He acquired several farms with significant forests, started saw mills, and established a shipyard on the island of Badskjærholmen (now Holmen). In the 1650s, he bought the farm Randvik at Søndeled in Aust-Agder, which included the harbour of Risør and surrounding areas. 

In 1630, Risør became a privileged port (ladested) where citizens had the right to engage in trade and commodity importing, especially with lumber. Traders and merchants from the Netherlands  were the principal recipients of the timber export. Risør operated as a port under the jurisdiction of Skien  from 1630 and  under Kristiansand from 1641. In 1659, the port built a custom  house.

References

1601 births
1669 deaths
People from Risør
Norwegian company founders
Norwegian merchants
Norwegian landowners
Norwegian shipbuilders
17th-century Norwegian businesspeople